is the 21st single from the Japanese idol group Idoling!!!. It 
reached number 3 on M-ON! Countdown 100, number 2 on Music Station Single Ranking, and number 6 on 
Oricon Weekly Chart.
Idoling!!! was divided into two groups. The main body of the group stayed with the name Idoling!!!, while the other 
group was called Idoling NEO. Idoling NEO consists of Idoling!!!'s new members, who just joined in August 2013, 
with addition of #23 Yuna Ito and #25 Kaoru Goto. Both groups released a single at the same time, with Idoling!!! 
releasing Shout!!! as their 21st single under the Pony Canyon label and Idoling NEO released mero mero as 
their first single under the Avex label. Both had to compete on the Oricon weekly chart for which group sold more 
than the other. The losing side will then receive a severe punishment.

On November 25, 2013, it was announced that Idoling NEO lost in the competition. Idoling NEO has to receive the 
punishment, which is having to wear skinny tights.

Contents
Shout!!! was released in three types:
 Limited A-type Edition (CD and DVD)
 Limited B-type Edition (CD and Blu-ray)
 Normal Edition (CD)

Each of the covers of the Limited A and B features the same five main vocal members in the front with different supporting members behind the main vocalists. The main vocalists are #14 Hitomi Sakai, #15 Nao Asahi, #16 Ami Kikuchi, #21 Kaede Hashimoto, #29 Ramu Tamagawa.

The Limited A cover features the main vocalists and #6 Erica Tonooka, #12 Yui Kawamura, #17 Hitomi Miyake, #20 Ai Okawa, #26 Chika Ojima, #28 Karen Ishida.

The Limited B cover features the main vocalists and #3 Mai Endo, #9 Rurika Yokoyama, #13 Serina Nagano, #19 Yurika Tachibana, #22 Ruka Kurata, #27 Kurumi Takahashi, #30 Reia Kiyoku.

Track listing

Limited A-type edition

CD

DVD 
 Shout!!! -Music Video-
 Shout!!! -MV Dancing Ver.1-
 Shout!!! MV Making-of
 Omake no Shout!!!

Limited B-type edition

CD

Blu-ray 
 Shout!!! -Music Video-
 Shout!!! -MV Dancing Ver.1-
 Shout!!! -MV Dancing Ver.2-
 Shout!!! MV Making-of
 Omake no Shout!!!

Normal edition

CD

Notes
 #23 Yuna Ito and #25 Kaoru Goto do not participate in this single. They are temporarily transferred to Idoling NEO.
 Only One is performed by the 1st generation members; #3 Mai Endo, #6 Erica Tonooka, #9 Rurika Yokoyama. This is the second song performed by this trio, with the song voice on the single Sakura Thank You being the first one.

References

External links 
 Limited B-type Edition Shout!! on

iTunes Japan
 Normal Edition Shout!!! on iTunes Japan
 Idoling!!! official site - Fuji TV

Idoling!!! songs
2013 songs
Pony Canyon singles
2013 singles